Yala United Football Club (Thai สโมสรฟุตบอลยะลา ยูไนเต็ด) is a Thailand semi professional football club based in Yala Province. They currently play in Thai League 4 Southern Region. This football Club changes name to Yala United in 2015

In 2018, Club-licensing football club of this team didn't pass to play 2018 Thai League 4 Southern Region. This team is banned 2 years and Relegated to 2020 Thailand Amateur League Southern Region.

Stadium and locations

Season By Season record

Player squad

References

External links 
 Official Facebookpage
 Fanpage

Football clubs in Thailand
Association football clubs established in 2009
2009 establishments in Thailand
Yala province